Universal Blues is the debut album by Chicago-based rock band The Redwalls, released in the United States on November 18, 2003 by Undertow Music. In 2007, the band re-released Universal Blues on Princeton Lane Records with six bonus tracks from early band demos.

Track listing

Re-release bonus tracks
"Let It Ride"
"In My Song"
"Better Days"
"Please Listen"
"Untrue"
"Just a Day Away"

References

The Redwalls albums
2003 debut albums